The 1947 Calgary Stampeders finished in 2nd place in the W.I.F.U. with a 4–4 record. They were defeated in the W.I.F.U. Finals by the Winnipeg Blue Bombers.

Regular season

Season standings

Season schedule

Playoffs

Finals

Winnipeg won the total-point series by 29–22. Winnipeg advances to the Grey Cup game.

References

Calgary Stampeders seasons
1947 Canadian football season by team